Otrębusy  is a village in Poland, in Masovian Voivodship, to the west of Warsaw in the Gmina Brwinów.

History 
The first mention of Otrębusy come from Księgi Błońskie Ziemskie from 1525 and 1534. Latin spelling was used then: Otrambusche. Another source is Spis parafii województwa mazowieckiego (parish index of Masovian voivodship) from first half of the sixteenth century.

In 1948, in Karolin State Folk Group of Song and Dance 'Mazowsze' was founded.

In 1970 efforts to establish a parish begun. However, St. Mary the Virgin Mother of Church parish has been established in 1985.

Currently there are over 2000 residents in Otrębusy.

Communication 
 voivodship road 719 - 22 km to centre of Warsaw
 Warsaw Suburban Railway - about 38 minutes to Warszawa Śródmieście WKD

Tourism 
 park and palace Karolin - museum and head office of State Folk Group of Song and Dance 'Mazowsze'
 park and palace Toeplitzówka  - place of birth of Krzysztof Teodor Toeplitz
 natural monuments - list in Polish
 Svetovid monument at WKD station
 Museum of Technique and Motorisation
 Museum of Folk Art

External links 
 Museum of Technique and Motorisation

Otrębusy's inhabitants 
 bogate laski- famous Polish budyń's eaters and singers

Villages in Pruszków County